Toshi Kasai is a Japanense record producer, engineer, mixer and musician. He is most well known for his strong vocal production work with hard rock and metal groups such as his long standing relationship with The Melvins and his work with Tool.

In addition to his recorded production work, Toshi was a member of the band Big Business and Nate Mendel's band Lieutenant. He is also a member of Altamont, The Dale Crover Band. In 2019, he opened for Melvins and Redd Kross under his own name, playing Moog Synthesizer to oscilloscope and projections.

Biography 
Hilbish Design released a pedal of Toshi's design called the T-Fuzz, the pedal, like the other pedal designs of the manufacturer, features artwork by Mackie Osborne.

He also has his own project called Plan D, this project is similar to a drum-triggered synthesizer set with Dale Crover and Troy Zeigler (one show) where he opened for Melvins Lite in 2011. This set was cited as an inspiration behind the Plan D project.

On March 12, 2020 Joyful Noise Recordings announced the release of his project: Plan D. It was received with favorable coverage from outlets such as Rolling Stone and others:

"From his LA studio, Toshi created a complex drum-triggering system which is the catalyst for Plan D. He then spent the last several years luring drummers into his Sound of Sirens studio, letting them go nuts behind the kit. Meanwhile, Toshi has been behind the board, capturing the signal from each drum hit, and sending that signal to a variety of analog synthesizers. The result is some of the craziest sounding prog-like instrumental music you're likely to ever hear."

included on the project are drummers: 
Dale Crover (Melvins, Redd Kross, Nirvana, Hew Time)
Coady Willis (Big Business, Melvins, The Murder City Devils, Hew Time)
Clem Burke (Blondie, Eurythmics)
Matt Cameron (Pearl Jam, Soundgarden)
Joe Plummer (Mister Heavenly, Cold War Kids, The Shins, Hew Time)
Paul Christensen ( Qui, hepa.Titus)
Troy Zeigler (Serj Tankian, Juliette Lewis, Buckethead)
Ches Smith (Secret Chiefs 3, Marc Ribot, Mary Halvorson)
Matt Chamberlain (Fiona Apple, Bob Dylan, Bill Frisell)
Danny Frankel (Lou Reed, Kamikaze Ground Crew, Urban Verbs, Bo Diddley)
Gregg Bissonette (Ringo Starr, David Lee Roth, Electric Light Orchestra)
Pej Mon (Satyasena, Secret Chiefs 3, Girth)
Mindee Jorgensen (Dale Crover Band, Dangerously Sleazy, ModPods)
Dave Lombardo (Mr Bungle, Misfits, Suicidal Tendencies) 
John Tempesta (The Cult, White Zombie, Testament)
Stephen Perkins (Jane's Addiction, Porno For Pyros, Infectious Grooves)
Kyle Stevenson (HELMET, Big Collapse)
Angela Lese (Jax Hollow, Raelyn Nelson Band)

Selected production work
Toshi Kasai has worked with the following musicians and groups.
 Melvins
 Jello Biafra
 Helmet
 Nate Mendel (of Foo Fighters)
 Matt Cameron of Soundgarden / Pearl Jam

Production engineering and mixing work

Band member
Big Business: Guitar, Keyboards, Backing vocals
Altamont: Guitar, Piano, Organ
Lieutenant (with Nate Mendel): Guitar, Keyboard
The Dale Crover Band: Keys, Banjo, Ukulele, Vocals
Plan D

References

Interviews and External links
  website
| Interview | Toshi Kasai "I don't need to be shy"

Living people
People from Los Angeles
Japanese record producers
Year of birth missing (living people)